Count Jan Kanty Zamoyski (4 August 1900, in Stará Ľubovňa – 28 September 1961, in Monte Carlo) was a Polish aristocrat.

He was the son of Count Andrzej Przemysław Zamoyski and Princess Maria Carolina of Bourbon-Two Sicilies, granddaughter of King Francis I of the Two Sicilies.

He was owner of estates in Ľubovňa, Vyšné Ružbachy and Mníšek in Spiš.

Marriage and issue
Jan Kanty married Princess Isabel Alfonsa of Bourbon-Two Sicilies on 9 March 1929 in Madrid and had four children:

 Count Karol Alfons Zamoyski (28 October 1930 – 26 October 1979)
 Countess Maria Krystyna Zamoyska (2 September 1932 – 6 December 1959)
 Count Józef Michal Zamoyski (born 27 June 1935-22/23 May 2010)
 Countess Maria Teresa Zamoyska (born 18 April 1938)

References

1900 births
1961 deaths
Jan Kanty
Knights of Malta
People from Stará Ľubovňa